Maloye Vosnoye is a rural locality (a village) and the administrative center of Zalesskoye Rural Settlement, Ustyuzhensky District, Vologda Oblast, Russia. The population was 301 as of 2002.

Geography 
Zykovo is the nearest rural locality.

References 

Rural localities in Ustyuzhensky District